Jimmi Saputra (born December 2, 1972 in Jakarta) is an Indonesian technology entrepreneur and businessman. He is the founder and CEO of Tiga Digital Token,  an Indonesian company that operates a cryptocurrency exchange platform. The company launched a NFT gaming service, which expands on its first project NEFTiPEDiA, a NFT marketplace for creators.
Saputra is the founder of DOOiT, an e-wallet platform in Bali, where he serves as the CEO.

Saputra is also an advisor  to the State Defense Forum, which falls under the Defense Ministry. He was co-founder and chief commercial officer at KOKi Teknologi Indonesia until May 2019. He has founded several companies in field of hospitality and tourism in Bali.

References

1972 births
Living people
Indonesian businesspeople